Tibor Jankovics (born 20 September 1960) is a Slovak wrestler. He competed in the men's Greco-Roman 52 kg at the 1988 Summer Olympics.

References

External links
 

1960 births
Living people
Slovak male sport wrestlers
Olympic wrestlers of Czechoslovakia
Wrestlers at the 1988 Summer Olympics
Sportspeople from Komárno